Footprints live! is a live album by saxophonist Wayne Shorter released on Verve Records in 2002. It was Shorter's first official live album released under his own name and the first album to feature his 'Footprints Quartet' with pianist Danilo Perez, bassist John Patitucci and drummer Brian Blade.

Reception
The Allmusic review by Robert L. Doerschuk awarded the album 3 stars, stating "They're even playful; try to catch that "Rock-A-Bye Baby" quote from Shorter in the title track.".

Track listing 

All compositions by Wayne Shorter except as indicated

 "Sanctuary" - 5:31
 "Masqualero" - 8:28
 "Valse Triste" - 7:59 (Jean Sibelius, arr. by Shorter)
 "Go" - 5:01
 "Aung San Suu Kyi" - 9:28
 "Footprints" - 7:55
 "Atlantis" - 8:28
 "JuJu" - 10:39

Tracks 1, 2 and 6:  Live at the Festival de Jazz de Vitoria-Gasteiz in Spain, July 20, 2001

3, 4, 5 and 7:  Live at the Jardins Palais Longchamps in Marseille, France, July 24, 2001

8:  Live at the Umbria Jazz Festival in Perugia, Italy, July 14, 2001

Personnel 
Footprints Quartet
 Wayne Shorter – tenor saxophone (1-4, 6-8), soprano saxophone (5, 6, 8)
 Danilo Perez – grand piano
 John Patitucci – bass
 Brian Blade – drums

Production
 Wayne Shorter – producer 
 Richard Seidel – executive producer 
 Rob Griffin – recording, mixing 
 Julie Strickler – recording assistant 
 Jeff Ciampa – assistant engineer 
 Mark Wilder – mastering at Sony Music Studios (New York, NY)
 Theodora Kuslan – release coordinator 
 Kelly Pratt – release coordinator 
 Hollis King – art direction 
 Sachico Asano – design 
 Kate Garner – photography 
 Ronnie White – photography

References

2002 live albums
Wayne Shorter live albums
Verve Records live albums